The Sixth Federal Electoral District of the Federal District (VI Distrito Electoral Federal del Distrito Federal) is one of the 300 Electoral Districts into which Mexico is divided for the purpose of elections to the federal Chamber of Deputies and one of 27 such districts in the Federal District ("DF" or Mexico City).

It elects one deputy to the lower house of Congress for each three-year legislative period, by means of the first past the post system.

District territory
Under the 2005 districting scheme, the DF's Sixth District covers a roughly rectangular area in the north-east of the borough (delegación) of Gustavo A. Madero.

Previous districting schemes

1996–2005 district
Between 1996 and 2005, the Sixth District roughly the same area of Gustavo A. Madero.

Deputies returned to Congress from this district

L Legislature
 1976–1979: Alfonso Rodríguez Rivera (PRI)
LI Legislature
 1979–1982: Daniel Mejía Colín (PRI)
LII Legislature
 1982–1985: Venustiano Reyes López (PRI)
LIII Legislature
 1985–1988:
LIV Legislature
 1988–1991: Sara Villalpando (PRI)
LV Legislature
 1991–1994:
LVI Legislature
 1994–1997: Claudia Esqueda Llanes (PRI)
LVII Legislature
 1997–2000:
LVIII Legislature
 2000–2003: Nelly Campos Quiróz (PAN)
LIX Legislature
 2003–2006: Edgar Torres Baltazar (PRD)
LX Legislature
 2006–2009: María Elena Torres Baltazar (PRD)

References and notes

Federal electoral districts of Mexico
Mexico City